This List of Colombian writers is an alphabetical list of writers born or brought up in Colombia, who already have Wikipedia pages in the English or Spanish Wikipedia. References for information given in the list appear on the Wikipedia pages concerned. This is a subsidiary list to the List of Colombian people. The list is far from exhaustive, so please help to expand it by adding Wikipedia page-owning published writers who have written in any genre or field, including science and scholarship, but does not include those whose sole body of work lies outside conventional published literature such as: print journalists, bloggers, editors, librettists, lyricists, songwriters, playwrights, or screenwriters. Please follow the entry format: use Spanish naming customs by listing both surnames of the person, use italics for authors who are best known under a pseudonym, indicate only the year of birth or the years of birth and death, and do not include place of birth or works associated with the writer, as that information should be found in their actual page.

A

B

C

D

E

 Orlando Echeverri Benedetti (born 1980)

F

G

I

J

L

M

N

O

William Ospina Buitrago (born 1954)

P

R

S

T

U

V

Z

See also

Colombian literature
List of Latin American writers
David Bushnell

Colombian
Writers